Phormoestes is a genus of moths in the family Choreutidae, containing only one species, Phormoestes palmettovora, which is known from Florida, United States.

The length of the forewings is 3.3–4 mm. Adults are on wing from March to May.

The larvae feed on Sabal palmetto. Larvae have been found boring within the minute flower pods of the inflorescence of the host plant. After sufficient feeding, the larvae apparently take one of the hollowed out flower pods and form a pupal case, having a flap on the distal end, and transport this case to the ventral side of one of the large palm leaves. The pupal case is attached to the midrib of one of the many leaflets of the palm leaf. It appears that larvae or pupae overwinter in the pupal case and adults of the first generation emerge the following March, when the palms are again producing inflorescences.

References

Millieriidae